Aadu Puli Aattam is a 2006 Indian Tamil-language action film directed by Sanjay Ram and produced by Opa Creations. The film stars Mani Prakash, Vennila and Rekasri. It was released on 15 December 2006.

Cast 
Mani Prakash as Mandhiran
Vennila as Gayathri
Rekasri
Damodhara Raju as Sadayan
Sudhakar Vasanth as Vellaithurai
Poovilangu Mohan as Gayathri's father

Production 
Sanjay Ram made a series of quick action films in the mid-2000s, and moved on to his next film, Iyakkam (2008), before the release of Aadu Puli Aattam. The film was said to be loosely based on ex-rowdy from Tirunelveli, named Sadayan.

Reception 
The film opened to positive reviews from critics. Malini Mannath of Chennai Online wrote that "in depicting the game between the hunter and the hunted, the debutant director is focused, and moves his narration at a racy pace", and added that "the director has chosen his cast well, with each character, even the ones in smaller roles, suitably placed".

A reviewer from news portal Filmibeat noted "director Sanjay Ram has deftly combined a tender love story with the atrocities of gangsters" and that "on the whole, Aadu Puli Aattam is a movie worth seeing". A reviewer from Indiaglitz.com noted "a quick narration of events is the highlight of the movie" and that "Sanjay Ram has ensured that no momentum is lost anywhere in the film. The director seems to have done intense research about the presence of underworld in southern districts and got it right on the screen. The director can certainly feel proud for making an honest and sincere attempt, which is strikingly different from films of the same genre".

References

External links

2006 films
2000s Tamil-language films
Indian action films